The George R. Lutz House is a single family home located at 103 West Henry Street in Saline, Michigan. It was listed on the National Register of Historic Places in 1985.

History
This house was constructed in about 1900 for George Nissly. In 1903, George R. Lutz and his wife Gertrude purchased the house from Nissly's estate for $2000. Lutz, a Village clerk and bank employee, died in 1904 at the age of 30. Gertrude Lutz remained living in the house until her own death in the 1940s.

Description
The George R. Lutz House is a 2-1/2 story Queen Anne structure covered with clapboard. It has a hipped roof with front and side gable projections. The facade features a fine example of a wraparound Eastlake with a lattice work base, spool-and-spindle frieze and balusters, and decorative brackets. The house has a variety of window shapes, including small rectangular windows in the gable ends.

References

		
National Register of Historic Places in Washtenaw County, Michigan
Queen Anne architecture in Michigan
Houses completed in 1900